The Rhode Island Medical Society Building is a historic commercial building in Providence, Rhode Island. It is a two-story brick Federal Revival building, designed by Clarke, Howe & Homer, and built in 1911–12. It has a five-bay main facade and a bowed south-facing bay. The main entrance is recessed under a cast-stone entryway. The Rhode Island Medical Society was founded in 1812, and is one of the oldest medical societies in the nation. The building served as their headquarters from 1912 to 2002. The building was renovated in 2010 and is now occupied by Moran Shipping Agencies Inc.

See also
 National Register of Historic Places listings in Providence, Rhode Island

References

Buildings and structures completed in 1911
Commercial buildings on the National Register of Historic Places in Rhode Island
Buildings and structures in Providence, Rhode Island
National Register of Historic Places in Providence, Rhode Island